Peter Combe's Christmas Album is the seventh studio and first Christmas music album by Australian children's musician Peter Combe. It was released in November 1990 and peaked at number 49 on the ARIA Charts, becoming Combe's highest charting album. The album was certified gold in December 1990.

Track listing
 "Happy Christmas to You"	
 "Christmas Eve"	
 "Tell Me the Story"	
 "Star Shines Bright"	
 "Baby Lying in a Manger"	
 "Chock a Block (The Inn Keeper's Song)"	
 "Rejoice Rejoice"	
 "Hang Up Your Stocking"	
 "Christmas Is Coming"	
 "To You Merry Christmas"	
 "Love & Joy"	
 "Caesar's Decree Song"	
 "Ping"	
 "O Little One"	
 "Fear Not for I"	
 "Christmas Child"	
 "Christmas Is Coming"

All songs composed, arranged and produced by Peter Combe.

Charts

Weekly charts

Year end charts

Certifications

Release history

References

1990 albums
Peter Combe albums
Christmas albums by Australian artists